TV Emsdetten is a handball club from Emsdetten, Germany. Currently, they compete in the 3. Liga.

Accomplishments
2. Handball-Bundesliga: 1
: 2013

Team

Current squad
Squad for the 2022–23 season

Goalkeepers
 16  Ante Vukas
 21  Oliver Krechel

Left wingers
 14  Paul Kolk
 22  Dirk Holzner
Right wingers
7  Yannick Terhaer
9  Tobias Reichmann
Line players
6  Mateusz Piechowski
 11  Jakob Schwabe
 35  Marius Kluwe

Left backs
 13  Ole Schramm
 23  Robin Jansen
 24  Lutz Weßeling
Centre backs
8  Bjarne Budelmann
 17  Marcel Schliedermann
 34  Anton Rúnarsson
Right backs
 89  Gabor Langhans
 99  Maximilian Nowatzki

Transfers
Transfers for the 2022–23 season

 Joining
  Ante Vukas (GK) (from  SGSH DRAGONS)
  Lutz Weßeling (LB) (from  TSG Altenhagen-Heepen)
  Bjarne Budelmann (CB) (from  ATSV Habenhausen)
  Tobias Reichmann (RW) (from  MT Melsungen)
  Marius Kluwe (P) (from  TV Bissendorf-Holte)
  Mateusz Piechowski (P) (free agent)

 Leaving
  Maurice Paske (GK) (to  VfL Eintracht Hagen)
  Darko Dimitrievski (LB) (to  Recoletas Atlético Valladolid)
  Örn Vésteinsson Östenberg (LB) (to  Haslum HK)
  Josip Vekić (RB) (to ?)
  Rene Mihaljević (P) (to  TuS Ferndorf)
  Frederic Stüber (P) (to  VfL Eintracht Hagen)

References

External links

German handball clubs
Handball-Bundesliga
Steinfurt (district)
Sport in North Rhine-Westphalia
Handball clubs established in 1898
1898 establishments in Germany